The Sonata 6.7 is a trailerable sailboat, that was designed by American Gary Mull and first built in 1986. The design is out of production.

Production
The boat was built by Sonata Yachts in Australia, which completed 40 examples starting in 1986.

Design
The Sonata 6.7 is a small recreational keelboat, built predominantly of fiberglass. It has a fractional sloop rig, an internally-mounted spade-type rudder and a fixed fin keel. It displaces  and carries  of ballast.

There was a lifting keel version produced as well.

See also
List of sailing boat types

Similar sailboats
Buccaneer 220
Ranger 22
US Yachts US 22
Tanzer 22
Triton 22

References

Keelboats
1980s sailboat type designs
Sailing yachts
Sailboat type designs by Gary Mull
Trailer sailers
Sailboat types built by Sonata Yachts